The Margaret W. Rossiter History of Women in Science Prize is awarded by the History of Science Society for an outstanding book or article on the history of women in science. It is named after Professor Margaret W. Rossiter, a pioneer in the field of the role of women in science.

Recipients
Source: History of Science Society

See also

 Women in science
 Women in chemistry
 List of history awards
 List of science and technology awards for women
 List of general science and technology awards

References

History of science awards
Science awards honoring women
Awards established in 1987
American awards
1987 establishments in the United States